The Toyota Blizzard is a four-wheel-drive vehicle built by Daihatsu for Toyota from March 1980 into the 1990s. It was built by Daihatsu, with the first generation LD10 a version of the Daihatsu Taft and the second generation Blizzard (LD20) based on the Daihatsu Rugger.



Blizzard (LD10)

The LD10 Blizzard was launched in 1980 and is based on the Daihatsu Taft (also known as the Scat), and was replaced in 1984 with the LD20, based on the Daihatsu Rugger. The Blizzard was only intended for the Japanese domestic market.

The Blizzard LD10 equipped with the naturally aspirated 2.2 (2188 cc) L diesel engine. The engines were originally coupled to a Toyota 4-speed manual transmission, while 1983+ models came with a 5-speed.

It is a rare Toyota vehicle with less than a dozen known examples in North America. Visually very similar to the Daihatsu vehicles, they were rebadged by Toyota and utilize Toyota engines.

Blizzard (LD20)

The LD20 Blizzard is based on the Daihatsu Rugger and is equipped with the 2.4-litre (2446 cc) 2L diesel engine producing 83 PS, and from 1985 it was fitted with the 96 PS 2L-T turbodiesel. The Blizzard has part-time four-wheel-drive with a 5-speed manual transmission with a 2-speed transfer case. 

The LD20 underwent a minor facelift in 1987 and can be identified by the change from round to rectangular headlamps and larger bumpers.

References

External links
 
 Toyota Blizzard 2.4T Ownership & Light Mods Journal

Blizzard
Pickup trucks
All-wheel-drive vehicles